MS Danielle Casanova, is a French cruiseferry operated by Corsica Linea. She was built at Fincantieri in Ancona, Italy for the French ferry operator SNCM as Mediterranee but was renamed after her launch. She was put in 2002 on the Marseille–Corsica route, replacing the former Danielle Casanova which was put to the Marseille–Algeria–Tunisia. The newer Danielle Casanova was itself later transferred to Corsica Linea's fleet after the bankruptcy of the SNCM in 2016. She then sailed on the Marseille–Tunisia–Algeria route.

Name
The ship is named after Danielle Casanova (9 January 1909 – 9 May 1943), a Corsican hero of the French Resistance during World War II who was captured and deported to Auschwitz where she died.

See also
Largest ferries of Europe

References

External links
 
 Danielle Casanova on Corsica Linea official website

Cruiseferries
Ferries of France
Ships built in Ancona
Ships built by Fincantieri
2001 ships